Sypalettus or Sypalettos was a deme in ancient Attica of the phyle of Cecropis, sending two delegates to the Athenian Boule.

Probably Sypalettus was a divided deme, even if this hypothesis is not confirmed by all scholars. The inscription that suggests the placement of the deme is a sacred calendar of 470-460 BCE; this document it is very important because it is the first Attican written text that prohibits changes to the law.

Its site is located near Nea Ionia (formerly, Kukuvaones).

References

Populated places in ancient Attica
Former populated places in Greece
Demoi